Hypatima mycetinopa is a moth in the family Gelechiidae. It was described by Edward Meyrick in 1934. It is found in Fiji.

References

Hypatima
Taxa named by Edward Meyrick
Moths described in 1934